This page details the match results and statistics of the Benin national football team from 2020 to present.

Results
Benin's score is shown first in each case.

Notes

Record by opponent

References

Benin national football team results
2020s in Benin